White Williams is the music project of Cleveland/New York-based musician Joe Williams. He released one album and EP under this name before using the Motion Graphics moniker. In August 2016 the self-titled album was released through Domino Records.

Background
Williams was born in Cleveland, Ohio. Williams's started playing music as a fifteen-year-old drummer for Ohio area bands Oblongata (Cleveland), Machete (Cincinnati), Mr Mad Man (Cincinnati) and USA Crypt (Cincinnati).

Williams spent the next two years recording Smoke while traveling between Cincinnati, New York City, Cleveland, and San Francisco.

In 2013, he soundtracked the film 12 O'Clock Boys. Williams' debut album under the Motion Graphics alias, Motion Graphics (2016), features melodies resembling instruments like marimbas and clarinets created with symphonic software mixed with crystal synths, drum patterns and understated vocals, resulting in what Max Pearl of Resident Advisor described as an "uncanny pop hybrid of human and computer music". The release was Williams' first for Domino Records. Thump described the album as a reflection of how "we use technology and communicate in a digital era."

Members
Joseph Williams - vocals, melodica, synth, laptop
Hayes Shanesy - guitar, vocals
Tyler - bass guitar
Cale Parks - drums
Andriu Strasser - art
Matthew Papich- guitar

Discography
As White Williams:

New Violence EP (September 25, 2007)
Smoke (November 6, 2007)

As Motion Graphics:

Motion Graphics (2016)

References

External links
Tigerbeat6 Official website.

Dazed Digital – Interview With White Williams

Indie rock musical groups from Ohio
Musical groups established in 2005
Double Six Records artists
Vaporwave musicians